Lush Life is a 1967 album by Nancy Wilson, arranged by Billy May, Sid Feller, and Oliver Nelson.

In his AllMusic review, Nick Dedina says the album continues "Wilson's winning formula of combining jazz and adult pop." He also praises Billy May's arrangement of the title track "as a means to tip his hat to Billy Strayhorn, the song's composer, with a smart mix of big band swagger, intimate small-group jazz, and moody orchestral flourishes straight out of an old film noir."

Author and music critic Will Friedwald also recommends the title song, hailing it as one of the "good orchestral versions" of the famous jazz standard and commending Wilson for how she "slyly uses 'A-Train' as a countermelody."

A 1970 LP reissue was entitled The Right To Love. In 1995, Capitol released the album on compact disc under its original title, with one additional track ("Do You Know Why") and a different song order.

Track listing

1967 Original LP

1995 CD reissue

Personnel

Performance
From The Music of Billy May: A Discography (Greenwood Press, 1998).
Nancy Wilson – vocals
Ted Nash –clarinet, flute
Abe Most – clarinet, flute
Justin Gordon – bassoon, clarinet, flute
Harry Klee – bass flute, clarinet, flute
Robert Hardaway – English horn, bassoon, clarinet, flute
Phillip Teele – trombone
Vincent DeRosa – French horn
Henry Sigismonti – French horn
Richard Mackey – French horn
William Hinshaw – French horn
Donn Trenner – piano
John Collins – guitar
Buster Williams – double bass
Shelly Manne – drums
Larry Bunker – percussion
Victor Feldman – percussion
Ann Stockton – harp
Catherine Gotthoffer – harp

References

1967 albums
Nancy Wilson (jazz singer) albums
Albums arranged by Billy May
Albums arranged by Oliver Nelson
Albums arranged by Sid Feller
Albums produced by Dave Cavanaugh
Capitol Records albums
Albums recorded at Capitol Studios